Divine Mercy in Song is a project of Trish Short, founder of the nonprofit organization Artists for Life. After composing a contemporary version of the Divine Mercy prayer, her song became widely used for this rosary prayer.

History

After Trish Short founded the nonprofit group Artists for Life in 2000, the National Shrine of The Divine Mercy located in Stockbridge, Massachusetts commissioned her to compose a Contemporary Christian music song based on the Divine Mercy Chaplet in 2002. Based on a prayer from Diary: Divine Mercy in My Soul by St. Maria Faustina Kowalska, Short produced the CD and sings one of three lead vocalist parts, with Michael Bethea and Crystal Yates.

The Marians of the Immaculate Conception and the Eucharistic Apostles of The Divine Mercy helped Short produce a video filmed at the National Shrine of The Divine Mercy in 2002.The Chaplet of Divine Mercy in Song has been heard on EWTN Global Catholic Network. Short said she believed she had fallen "beyond the reach of God's mercy" until a friend told her about the message of Divine Mercy.

A Spanish version of Short's Rosary-based prayer, La Coronilla de La Divina Misericordia, Cantada (The Chaplet of the Divine Mercy, Sung) and Generations Unite in Prayer: The Divine Mercy Chaplet in Song are other productions from Divine Mercy in Song.

See also
Divine Mercy
Rosary based prayers
Chaplet of Divine Mercy
Divine Mercy Sunday
Saint Mary Faustina Kowalska

References

Further reading
Diary: Divine Mercy in My Soul by Faustina Kowalska 2003  (online version)

External links
Complete version of video The Chaplet of Divine Mercy in Song. Divine Mercy in Song.  Retrieved on March 30, 2016.
Complete version of the video La Coronilla de La Divina Misericordia, Cantada video (The Chaplet of the Divine Mercy, Sung). Divine Mercy in Song. Retrieved on March 30, 2016.

Divine Mercy
Catholic adoration of Jesus
Christian terminology
Catholic devotions